The Expo Center at the South Florida Fairgrounds (also known as the South Florida Fair), formerly the Americraft Expo Center, is a 5,000-seat multi-purpose venue in West Palm Beach, Florida, located at 9067 Southern Boulevard, within a few miles of Royal Palm Beach, Wellington and Loxahatchee. It has also hosted several WWE house shows. It was originally built in 1990 as a  facility and was expanded to its current size in 2002.
650,000 people attend various events at the Expo Center on an annual basis. These events constitute 250 event days.

References

External links

Indoor arenas in Florida
Sports venues in Palm Beach County, Florida
Buildings and structures in West Palm Beach, Florida
1990 establishments in Florida
Event venues established in 1990
Sports venues completed in 1990